Škrljevo is a settlement just west of Šentrupert in southeastern Slovenia. The area is part of the historical region of Lower Carniola and is now included in the Southeast Slovenia Statistical Region. It includes the hamlet of Češnjice.

Škrljevo Castle is a castle on the western edge of the settlement. It was first mentioned in written documents dating to 1044. The current building dates to the 15th and 17th centuries with some 19th-century rebuilding.

References

External links
Škrljevo at Geopedia

Populated places in the Municipality of Šentrupert